Salem Presbyterian Parsonage, also known as the Old Manse, is a historic parsonage associated with Salem Presbyterian Church and located at Salem, Virginia. The core section was built in 1847, and is a two-story, central passage plan, brick I-house.  A front section was added to the core in 1879, giving the house an "L"-shaped configuration; an addition in 1922 filled in the "L".  A dining room addition built between 1896 and 1909 connected the main house to a formerly detached kitchen dating to the 1850s. The house features Greek Revival style exterior and interior detailing. The front facade features a one-story porch with a hipped roof supported by fluted Doric order columns. The Salem Presbyterian Church acquired the house in 1854; they sold the property in 1941.

It was added to the National Register of Historic Places in 1992.

References

Houses on the National Register of Historic Places in Virginia
Greek Revival houses in Virginia
Houses completed in 1847
Houses in Salem, Virginia
National Register of Historic Places in Salem, Virginia
1847 establishments in Virginia